Queeny Park is a park located in unincorporated St. Louis County, Missouri. It is one of the largest parks in the St. Louis County Parks system.

History
In 1854, Hyacinth Renard built Jarville, a Greek Revival style home, in the land that would later become Queeny Park. Queeny Park was a part of Edgar M Queeny's estate, the former chairman of Monsanto, before being sold to a realty investment company in 1964. The money earned was donated to Barnes-Jewish Hospital in St. Louis. In 1970, the Queenys bought back the estate and started the process of converting the estate into a park. $2,050,000 was spent on upgrading the estate into a park with proper landscaping, a family recreational area, and a memorial complex for Edward Greensfeelder, one of the primary financial backers of the conversion from estate to a park. In 1974, the memorial complex was dedicated and opened to the public. In December 2019, the St. Louis County Council voted to allow deer hunts at all St. Louis County Parks, including Queeny.

See also
Parks in Greater St. Louis

References

 

1974 establishments in Missouri
Buildings and structures in St. Louis County, Missouri
Tourist attractions in St. Louis
Parks in Missouri